Edgar Merle Settlemire (January 19, 1903 – June 12, 1988) was an American professional baseball player, manager and scout. A left-handed pitcher, he appeared in 30 games in Major League Baseball for the 1928 Boston Red Sox.

Settlemire was born in Santa Fe, Ohio. His professional career began in 1924 and continued for 17 seasons over 21 years, through 1944. In his only year in the major leagues, he dropped all six of his decisions for a 57–96–1 Red Sox team that finished eighth and last in the American League, 43 games behind the World Series champion New York Yankees. Of his 30 appearances, nine were starts. He allowed 116 hits, 50 earned runs and 34 bases on balls in 82 innings pitched, with only 12 strikeouts.

He managed in the minor leagues from 1939–1942 and 1945–1947 in the Ohio State League, Northeast Arkansas League, Appalachian League and Eastern League. He later was a scout for the Brooklyn Dodgers.

External links

1903 births
1988 deaths
Baseball players from Ohio
Boston Red Sox players
Brooklyn Dodgers scouts
Charlotte Hornets (baseball) players
Chattanooga Lookouts players
Dallas Steers players
Greeneville Burley Cubs players
Hartford Laurels players
Kingsport Dodgers players
Landis Senators players
Laurel Lumberjacks players
Lima Pandas players
Major League Baseball pitchers
Meridian Mets players
Minor league baseball managers
Mobile Bears players
Montgomery Lions players
Nashville Vols players
Newport Dodgers players
Ohio State League players
People from Logan County, Ohio
Sydney Steel Citians players
Wilkes-Barre Barons (baseball) players
Richmond Roses players